Too Colourful for the League is a 52-minutes 2001 Canadian documentary film made for CBC-TV, directed by Daniel Cross and Mila Aung-Thwin and produced by Diversus Productions. The film was produced by Evan Beloff, Ari Cohen and Max Wallace, who were nominated for a Gemini Award for best documentary. It was written by Max Wallace and co-produced by Daniel Cross.

This documentary examines the struggle of blacks in hockey in Canada from the 1930s to the present day telling the story of black players' courage and determination to play in a white-dominated sport. It focuses on an effort by former Montreal citizenship judge Richard Lord to nominate legendary black hockey player Herb Carnegie into the Hockey Hall of Fame. During the 1940s, Carnegie was widely acknowledged as one of the best hockey players in the world, playing alongside Jean Béliveau for the Quebec Aces. Yet he never was allowed to play in the NHL because of a long-time color barrier, which was only broken a decade later by Willie O'Ree of the Boston Bruins. In the film, veteran Hockey Hall of Fame referee Red Storey recalls watching Carnegie try out for Toronto Maple Leafs owner Conn Smythe. According to Storey, Smythe turned to him and said, "I'd give $10,000 to turn that boy white."

It was broadcast by CBC, CTV, CBC Newsworld and Canal Plus.

See also
List of black ice hockey players

References

External links

2001 films
EyeSteelFilm films
Canadian documentary television films
Documentary films about ice hockey
Documentary films about Black Canadians
Documentary films about racism in Canada
History of Black people in Canada
2001 documentary films
Racism in sport
Anti-black racism in Canada
Films directed by Daniel Cross
Canadian ice hockey films
CBC Television original films
Canadian sports documentary films
2000s English-language films
2000s Canadian films